Brilliant Lies is a 1996 Australian drama film produced by Bayside Pictures and Beyond Films. It stars Gia Carides and Anthony LaPaglia. It was directed by Richard Franklin and produced by Sue Farrelly, Kim McKillop and Richard Franklin. It was written by Peter Fitzpatrick and Richard Franklin, based on a play by David Williamson.

Nerida Tyson-Chew composed the music score, the second time she had composed for a film directed by Richard Franklin (after Hotel Sorrento).

The film was an adaptation of David Williamson's play of the same name, published by Currency Press in 1993.

The theme song is included on Kate Ceberano's 1996 album Blue Box.

Plot synopsis
Susy Conner accuses former employer Gary Fitzgerald of harassment and unfair dismissal for failing to comply with his sexual demands. Relating the incident to conciliation lawyer Marion Lee, Susy comments that the trauma experienced should entitle her to a compensation payment of $40,000.

Cast
Anthony LaPaglia as Gary Fitzgerald
Gia Carides as Susy Connor
Zoe Carides as Katy Connor
Ray Barrett as Brian Connor
Catherine Wilkin as Marion Lee
Michael Veitch as Paul Connor
Neil Melville as Vince
Jennifer Jarman-Walker as Ruth Miller

Production
Richard Franklin had seen the play on stage and decided to make it after having successfully filmed a stage play Hotel Sorrento. The film was shot in July 1995.

Box office
Brilliant Lies grossed $199,329 in Australia.

Reception
Brilliant Lies received positive reviews from critics, earning an 80% approval rating on Rotten Tomatoes.

Accolades

See also
Cinema of Australia

References

External links

Brilliant Lies on Rotten Tomatoes
 

1996 films
1996 drama films
Australian drama films
Films based on works by David Williamson
1990s English-language films
Films shot in Melbourne
Plays by David Williamson
Films directed by Richard Franklin (director)
Films scored by Nerida Tyson-Chew
1990s Australian films